The Château de Cerisy-la-Salle, located in the French commune of Cerisy-la-Salle (in the Manche département, region of Normandy), hosts the Centre culturel international de Cerisy-la-Salle (CCIC), a prestigious venue for intellectual and scholarly encounters founded in 1952 by Anne Heurgon-Desjardins. The center is the home of the famous "Colloques de Cerisy" ("Cerisy Conferences"), a series of seminars which constitute an important reference in the recent history of French intellectual life. The expression "Colloque de Cerisy" also refers to the proceedings of these seminars, which are available from various publishers.

External links 
 
 

Cultural heritage of France
Education in Normandy
Academic conferences